The Federal Institute of Minas Gerais (Portuguese: Instituto Federal de Minas Gerais, IFMG), or in full: Federal Institute of Education, Science and Technology of Minas Gerais (Portuguese: Instituto Federal de Educação, Ciência e Tecnologia de Minas Gerais) is a polytechnic university or community college located in the Brazilian cities of Belo Horizonte, Bambuí, Congonhas, Formiga, Governador Valadares, Ouro Preto, Ouro Branco, São João Evangelista and João Monlevade.

The institution was created by Centro Federal de Educação Tecnológica de Ouro Preto, and the campus of Congonhas and Bambuí, by Centro Federal de Educação Tecnológica de Bambuí e the campus of Formiga and São João Evangelista, Escola Agrotécnica Federal de São João Evangelista.

See also
Federal University of Minas Gerais
Federal Institute of São Paulo

References

External links 
 

Minas Gerais
Educational institutions established in 2010
2010 establishments in Brazil
Universities and colleges in Minas Gerais